Svetlana Igumenova (born 11 March 1988) is a Russian taekwondo practitioner. 

She won a bronze medal in flyweight at the 2015 World Taekwondo Championships, after being defeated by Wu Jingyu in the semifinal. Her achievements at the European Taekwondo Championships include a bronze medal in 2014.

References

External links

1988 births
Living people
Russian female taekwondo practitioners
World Taekwondo Championships medalists
European Taekwondo Championships medalists
21st-century Russian women